The Medoc Trail Marathon is a marathon, 42.195 kilometres (26.219 mi) in length, held each October at Medoc Mountain State Park in Hollister, North Carolina. The race is run on a ten mile loop trail, with the second and third laps being run over a shorter version of the loop. The race is run in conjunction with a 10-mile run.

History

2009 In 2009 the Medoc Trail Marathon and 10-miler was held on October 17.  The race size increased to accommodate more runners, but both events were expected to sell out early.  The races were run in Medoc Mountain State Park located in Hollister, North Carolina.

2008 In 2008 the inaugural Medoc Trail Marathon and 10-miler was held on October 4.  The Rocky Mount Endurance Club launched a new trail event in Medoc Mountain State Park located in Hollister, North Carolina.  In its first year, the 10-miler sold out.

All runners received long sleeve race shirts, custom finishers medals, and a technical running hat. The Rocky Mount Endurance Club was still able to make a $1,000 contribution to the Medoc Mountain State Park with race proceeds.

During 2018 the RD decided to end the Marathon Event in favor of increasing number of runners for the 10 miler and creating a new 5 miler.  
http://www.medoctrailraces.com/races

Location
Medoc Mountain State Park is an area of North Carolina with running trails. For an experienced trail runner, it is an easy trail. There are a few steep short climbs up the bluffs and a few gradual smaller hills, but a lot of flats along the creek.

Race Director
The Medoc Trail Races are directed by the Rocky Mount Endurance Club, a non-profit running club founded in 2006 as a marathon training team.

Races

Medoc 10-Miler
The Park is set up for a  race. The race begins with a two mile (3 km) stretch on park access roads before entering the trails. Aggressive racers looking for an age group victory, and newbies testing their legs on trails will enjoy this event. Participants receive a race shirt, food, and a finisher's medal.

Medoc Trail Marathon
Finishers of the marathon receive a race medal, long sleeve shirt, other race amenities including well supported aid stations, and food at the finish.

Race Cap

2009 Races were limited to 350 total runners.
2008 Races were limited to 250 total runners.

Results

2008 Marathon Results: 

Women 1st: Staci Inscore, Raleigh NC 

Women 2nd: Kim Gilliam, Rocky Mount NC 

Women 3rd: Aline Lloyd, Durham NC 

Women Masters: Michele Lybarger, Irvington VA 

Men 1st: Tim Surface, Raleigh NC 

Men 2nd: Ronnie Weed, Chapel Hill NC 

Men 3rd: Mark Rostan, Valdese NC 

Men Masters:Bobby As well Jr., Cornelius NC

References 

Marathons in the United States
Tourist attractions in Halifax County, North Carolina
Sports in North Carolina